Lidzbark  is a town with 8,670 inhabitants in the Warmia-Masurian Voivodeship in Poland. It is located on the Wel river and Lake Lidzbark. The postal code for the entire area is 13-230. The town is popularly referred to as Lidzbark Welski, to distinguish it from Lidzbark Warmiński.

History

Lidzbark was founded in 1301. The town's Roman Catholic parish church was constructed in 1350.

Władysław II Jagiełło led his army through Lidzbark on July 9, 1410 before the Battle of Grunwald. On September 29, 1413, some of the Teutonic Knights in the town revolted against Heinrich von Plauen the Elder; they were only appeased with Plauen's replacement with Michael Küchmeister von Sternberg. The town joined the Prussian Confederation, which opposed Teutonic rule, and upon the request of which King Casimir IV Jagiellon reincorporated the territory to the Kingdom of Poland in 1454. In May 1454 Lidzbark pledged allegiance to the Polish King in Toruń. At the Second Peace of Thorn (1466) the Teutonic Knights renounced claims to the town and recognized it as part of Poland. Administratively it was located in the Chełmno Voivodeship in the province of Royal Prussia in the Greater Poland Province of the Polish Crown. A large portion of the city was destroyed by fire in 1764.

During the First Partition of Poland, the town was annexed by the Kingdom of Prussia in 1772. During the Napoleonic Wars it was part of the Polish Duchy of Warsaw from 1807 to 1815, but was reannexed by Prussia afterwards.

In 1772, the town had 510 inhabitants and 83 timbered buildings. Agriculture was common in the area along with crafting. In 1789, the population reached 802 of which 41 families were craftsmen.

In the beginning of the 20th century, the city had breweries, sawmills, iron mill, engine works and dairy products. In 1920, the area was reintegrated with Poland after it regained independence.

During World War II, it was under German occupation. The population in 1943 was 4,329. 70% of the city was destroyed during the war.

Sports

Twinnings

 Oebisfelde, Germany
 Co op municipality: Guttau, Germany
 Sovetsk, Kaliningrad Oblast, Russia

Address of administration

Urząd Miasta i Gminy
13-230 Lidzbark
ul. Sądowa 21
Tel.: (+48 23) 696-15-05
Fax.: (+48 23) 696-21-07

Notable people
Roman Antoszewski (1935–2017), plant physiologist

References

External links
 Homepage of Lidzbark (in Polish and German)
 Data of Lidzbark (in German)

Cities and towns in Warmian-Masurian Voivodeship
Działdowo County